Elomatic is a consulting & engineering partner in developing and improving industrial investments within the bio and pharmaceutical, food, chemical, paper, mechanical and marine sectors. Elomatic is a globally operating company.

History 

Elomatic was founded in Turku in 1970 by Ari Elo. An important step for Elomatic was taken in 1974 when Mr. Elo decided to invest in engineering model technology.

Ownership 

Elomatic is a privately owned corporation. The current chairman of the board of directors is Olli Manner.

Organisation 

Elomatic has four business units: Marine, Process, Mechanical and Cadmatic (3D design software).

References

External links 
Elomatic homepage

Engineering companies of Finland
Consulting firms established in 1970
Information technology consulting firms of Finland
Finnish companies established in 1970